Orfeu (or Orpheu) is the Portuguese for Orpheus, a legendary figure in Greek mythology, chief among poets and musicians.

Orfeu may refer to:

 Orfeu da Conceição, a 1956 Portuguese musical by Vinicius de Moraes
 Orfeu Negro (Black Orpheus), a 1959 French/Italian/Brazilian film based on the musical
 Orfeu, a 1999 Brazilian film, also based on the musical
 Orfeu (album)

Orfeu is also a name:

 Orfeu Bertolami, born 1959, Brazilian physicist

Orpheu may refer to:

 Orpheu, Portuguese art magazine, 1915, put out by the Geração de Orpheu

See also
 Orpheus (disambiguation), the English and German spelling
 Orphée (disambiguation), the French spelling
 Orfeas (disambiguation), Ορφέας, the Greek spelling
 Orfeo (disambiguation), the Italian spelling
 Orfey (disambiguation), Орфей, the Russian spelling